Charles Frederick Ferguson (20 July 1834 – 29 September 1909) was an Ontario physician and political figure. He represented Leeds North and Grenville North in the House of Commons of Canada as a Liberal-Conservative member from 1874 to 1896.

The son of Robert Ferguson, he was born in Kitley Township, where his family had settled after immigrating from Ireland, and studied medicine at Queen's College, graduating in 1859. He set up practice in Kemptville. Ferguson married a sister of Robert Bell, who had represented Russell in the assembly for the Province of Canada. He died in Kemptville in 1909.

His son George Howard Ferguson later served as Premier of Ontario.

References

External links

1834 births
1909 deaths
Members of the House of Commons of Canada from Ontario
Canadian people of Irish descent